Haldummulla is a town in the Badulla District, Uva Province, Sri Lanka.

The town suffered significant damage from a landslide in 2014.

Attractions 

 Bambarakanda Falls 
 Ohiya and Horton Plains via Kalupahana and Udaweriya Estate

Archeological sites

Prehistoric burial ground 
In 2010, a group of researchers found some evidence of a Prehistoric burial ground.

Prehistoric settlement
In 2011 archaeologists found evidence for an ancient settlement, the oldest and first ancient human dwelling to be found in the central hills in Sri Lanka.

Soragune Devalaya 

The Soragune Devalaya is a Buddhist temple dedicated to Kataragama deviyo. It was constructed by a provincial ruler of the area, in 1582, who was seeking the blessing/protection of Kataragama, while he was away from the province. The temple was destroyed by the Dutch but was subsequently reconstructed. The temple was declared a protected archaeological site in July 2007.

Portuguese Fort 

In the early 17th century the Portuguese established a stone fort at Haldummulla, which was used as a frontier post/staging area for Portuguese forces. It is also known as the Katugodalla fort. Only the foundations of the fort are still visible. The fort was declared a protected archaeological site in November 2002.

See also 
Hunugalagala Limestone Cave
Towns in Uva

References

External links 
 Relocation
 Sugar Cane Projects
 Organic Tea

Towns in Badulla District
2010 archaeological discoveries
2011 archaeological discoveries